The finest locally convex topological vector space (TVS) topology on  the tensor product of two locally convex TVSs, making the canonical map  (defined by sending  to )  continuous is called the inductive topology or the -topology.

Preliminaries

Throughout let  and  be locally convex topological vector spaces and  be a linear map. 

 If  is a subspace of  then both the quotient map  and the canonical injection  are homomorphisms. In particular, any linear map  can be canonically decomposed as follows:  where  defines a bijection. 
 A linear map  from a Hilbert space into itself is called positive if  for every  In this case, there is a unique positive map  called the square-root of  such that  
 If  is any continuous linear map between Hilbert spaces, then  is always positive.
 A linear map  is called compact or completely continuous if there is a neighborhood  of the origin in  such that  is precompact in 
 In a Hilbert space, positive compact linear operators, say  have a simple spectral decomposition discovered at the beginning of the 20th century by Fredholm and F. Riesz: 

Notation for topologies

 As usual, if  is considered as a topological vector space but it has not been made clear what topology it is endowed with, then the topology will be assumed to be

Universal property

Suppose that  is a locally convex space and that  is the canonical map from the space of all bilinear mappings of the form  going into the space of all linear mappings of  

See also

References

Bibliography

External links

 Nuclear space at ncatlab

Functional analysis
Topological vector spaces
Topology
Topological tensor products